Beate Schmittmann is a German-American condensed matter physicist and academic administrator who is dean of the College of Liberal Arts & Sciences at Iowa State University. Her research includes work on driven diffusive systems, biomolecular transport, and epidemiology.

Education and career
Schmittmann earned a diploma in physics in 1981 from RWTH Aachen University, and completed a Ph.D. in 1984 at the University of Edinburgh. Her dissertation was jointly supervised by David Wallace and A. D. Bruce.

After working as a researcher and then assistant professor at Heinrich Heine University Düsseldorf, she moved to the US in 1991 to become an associate professor of physics at Virginia Tech. She was promoted to full professor in 1997, and served as department chair from 2006 until 2012, when she moved to Iowa State as dean of Liberal Arts and Sciences. In 2017, Schmittmann was reappointed to the LAS deanship. While working in the United States, Schmittmann acquired American citizenship. In 2019, she was considered a finalist for the provost position at the University of Georgia.

Book
Schmittmann is the coauthor with Royce King-Ping Zia of the book Statistical Mechanics of Driven Diffusive Systems (Phase Transitions and Critical Phenomena, vol. 17, Academic Press, 1995).

Recognition
Schmittmann was named a Fellow of the American Physical Society (APS) in 2004, after a nomination from the APS Topical Group on Statistical & Nonlinear Physics, for "seminal and sustained research on fundamental and applied problems in non-equilibrium statistical physics, in particular driven diffusive systems". In 2010, the Southeastern Section of the APS gave her their  for research excellence. Schmittmann was the first woman to receive the Beams Award.

She became a Fellow of the American Association for the Advancement of Science in 2015 for "seminal and sustained research on fundamental and applied problems in nonequilibrium statistical physics, and for contributions to administration and to increasing diversity in STEM".

References

Year of birth missing (living people)
Living people
21st-century German physicists
German women physicists
21st-century American physicists
RWTH Aachen University alumni
Alumni of the University of Edinburgh
Academic staff of Heinrich Heine University Düsseldorf
Virginia Tech faculty
Iowa State University faculty
Fellows of the American Association for the Advancement of Science
Fellows of the American Physical Society
American women physicists
21st-century American women scientists
Naturalized citizens of the United States
20th-century American women scientists
20th-century American physicists
American condensed matter physicists
German emigrants to the United States
American university and college faculty deans
Women deans (academic)
20th-century German women scientists
21st-century German women scientists
20th-century German physicists
German academic administrators